Alexis Claude-Maurice (born 6 June 1998) is a French professional footballer who plays as forward for Ligue 1 club Lens, on loan from Nice.

Club career 
On 31 August 2022, Claude-Maurice joined Ligue 1 club Lens on a season-long loan. He scored his first goal with Lens on 1 January 2023 in a 3-1 win over leader Paris SG.

Personal life
Claude-Maurice is of Guadeloupean Malagasy descent.

Career statistics

Honours 
Nice

 Coupe de France runner-up: 2021–22

References

External links
 
 

1998 births
Living people
Association football forwards
French footballers
France under-21 international footballers
France youth international footballers
French people of Guadeloupean descent
Black French sportspeople
US Torcy players
FC Lorient players
OGC Nice players
RC Lens players
Ligue 2 players
Ligue 1 players
Championnat National players